Emmet Wan (born 26 March 1992) is an Irish-born Hong Kong professional footballer who plays as a defensive midfielder for Hong Kong Premier League club HKFC.

Club career

Kitchee 
Wan joined Kitchee in 2013. Soon he raised the interest of Kim Pan-gon to pick him for the Hong Kong national under-23 football team as he holds a Hong Kong SAR passport.

Southern 
After three loan spells in five years, Wan left Kitchee for a permanent move to fellow Hong Kong side Southern.

HKFC 
On 16 August 2022, it was reported Emmet would return to HKFC to play in the HKPL.

International career
In the summer of 2014, Wan was selected by Hong Kong national under-23 football team coach Kim Pan Gon to play in the 2014 Asian Games football tournament. He took part in the warm-up match against Newcastle United under-21 team. He played in the last 16 match against South Korea.

References

External links 
Emmet Wan at HKFA

Emmet Wan at Goal.com

Living people
1992 births
Hong Kong footballers
Republic of Ireland association footballers
Kitchee SC players
Southern District FC players
Lee Man FC players
Citizen AA players
Hong Kong FC players
Footballers at the 2014 Asian Games
Hong Kong people of Irish descent
Hong Kong Premier League players
Hong Kong First Division League players
Association football midfielders
Asian Games competitors for Hong Kong